Mary O'Malley (born 1954 in Connemara, Ireland) is an Irish poet whose work has been published in various literary magazines. She has published seven poetry books since 1990 and her poems have been translated into several languages.

Life
Mary O’Malley was born in Connemara and is a native Irish speaker. She was educated at University College, Galway. She spent eight years living in Portugal where she taught at the Universidade Nova de Lisboa. She returned to Ireland in the late 1980s, beginning a poetry career in 1990.

She lives near the village of Moycullen.  She teaches on the MA in Writing at the National University of Ireland, Galway.  She has held the Heimbold Chair of Irish Studies at Villanova University in Pennsylvania.  She has also held writing residencies at the Irish College in Paris, Tarragona, Spain and Manhattanville College, New York.

Her work has been published in Krino, Poetry Ireland, The Seneca Review, Atlanta Review, Da Braake Honde, Lictungen, The Lifelines Anthology and the Review of Irish American Studies.

She read at the 2009 Dublin Book Festival.

She was Arts Council Writer-in-Residence at the University of Limerick in 2016.

She is an elected member of Aosdána, the Irish national association of creative artists.

Awards
 1990 - Hennessy Award winner
 2009 - 13th annual Lawrence O'Shaughnessy Award
 2018 - Joint winner, Michael Hartnett Poetry Award (Playing the Octopus)
 2021 - Honorary degree, National University of Ireland, Galway

Works
"Macchu Picchu, Inis Mór"; "Canvas Currach II",  ASYLUM ROAD 
"A Cautionary Tale"

Books
A Consideration of Silk, Salmon Poetry Galway, 1990
Where the Rocks Float, Salmon, Galway, 1993
The Knife in the Wave, Salmon Co.Clare, 1997
Asylum Road, Salmon Publishing, 2001
The Boning Hall (New & Selected), Carcanet Press, Manchester, 2002
A Perfect V, Carcanet Press, Manchester, 2006.
Valparaiso, Carcanet Press, Manchester, 2012.
Playing the Octopus, Carcanet Press, 2016
Gaudent Angeli, Carcanet Press, 2019

Anthology
Three Irish Poets, Carcanet Press Ltd. 2003 
SALMON: A Journey in Poetry 1981-2007, edited by Jessie Lendennie 
The Making of a Poem: a Norton Anthology of Poetic Forms, edited by Eavan Boland and Mark Strand, W. W. Norton & Company; Reprint edition (April 2001)

References

Further reading
Allen Randolph, Jody. "Mary O'Malley." Close to the Next Moment: Interviews from a Changing Ireland. Manchester: Carcanet, 2010.

 McKenna, Bernard. "Such Delvings and Exhumations": The Quest for Self-Actualization in Mary O'Malley's Poetry. Contemporary Irish Women Poets, 1999

External links
Mary O'Malley, International Poetry Forum
"Irish Writers: Mary O'Malley", The Woman's Hour, BBC Radio 4
"Prize-winning Irish poet inspired by native seacoast", Tom Crann, Minnesota Public Radio, 17 April 2009

1954 births
Living people
Academics of the University of Galway
Alumni of the University of Galway
Aosdána members
Irish women poets
People from County Galway
Writers from County Galway